Balfour Castle is a historic building on the southwest of Shapinsay, Orkney Islands.  Though built around an older structure that dates at least from the 18th century, the present castle was built in 1847, commissioned by Colonel David Balfour, and designed by Edinburgh architect David Bryce. It is a Category A listed building and the landscape and formal gardens are listed in the Inventory of Gardens and Designed Landscapes in Scotland.

As of 2021, the castle was operating as a hotel.

Prehistory
The small island of Shapinsay has been inhabited since prehistoric times, the most notable evidence being the extant Broch of Burroughston, located not far from Balfour Castle to the northeast; moreover, the Mor Stein standing stone dating to the Stone Age is found also to the east of Balfour Castle, evidencing even earlier presence of man in the vicinity.

See also
Balfour, Orkney
Mill Dam, Shapinsay
Vasa Loch

Line notes

References
 J. Gunn, Orkney, the Magnetic North, Thomas Nelson and Sons, Edinburgh (1932)
 
 
 C. Michael Hogan. , Burroughston Broch, The Megalithic Portal, ed. Andy Burnham, October 7, 2007

Castles in Orkney
Inventory of Gardens and Designed Landscapes
Shapinsay
Country houses in Orkney
Category A listed buildings in Orkney
Castle, Orkney